The Nissan Navara is a nameplate used for Nissan pickup trucks with D21, D22, D40 and D23 model codes. The nameplate has been used in Australia, New Zealand, Central America, South America, Asia, Europe, and South Africa. In North, Central and South America and some selected markets, it is marketed as the Nissan Frontier or Nissan NP300.

After more than ten years with the D21, Nissan unveiled the similar sized D22. It was replaced with the bigger, taller, longer D40 mid-size pickup. In 2014, Nissan released its successor, the D23, for international markets other than the U.S. and Canada. For these markets, it received the D41 Frontier in 2021 to replace the D40.

The Navara gets its name from the Navarre region of northern Spain. The European version is built at the Nissan factory in Barcelona.



D21 series (1985) 

The D21 generation was the successor to the Datsun 720, sold as the Nissan Datsun Truck in Japan. The name Navara was used in some markets such as Australia / New Zealand.

Unlike previous generations, this model was available worldwide in two body styles. The "A" body was designed in Japan, and was available in single or dual cab variants, while the "S" body King Cab was designed in the United States, at Nissan's styling studios in San Diego, California. Each version had unique front styling, with the American version having a different hood, and wider flared front guards. In a few countries, such as Australia, both versions were sold. This was also assembled in Greece for the local market, where it was marketed as the Nissan Pickup and King Cab.

First generation (D22; 1997) 

The D22 is a compact size pick up truck manufactured from 1997 to 2004. However, Nissan continued to build the D22 as a cheaper alternative to the D40 in many markets.
Originally planned to follow the D21 Hard Body in being designed by Nissan Design International in La Jolla, CA, design of the D22 was reluctantly given to Japan during the 1994–1995 period. This was due to NDI being busy with many design projects for concepts and models, such as the Quest (VX54 II), Altima (L30), and Maxima (A32.5). Design of an updated D22 was eventually given to NDI in 1998.

North America 

US production of the Frontier at the Smyrna, Tennessee plant began in 1997 with a 2-door regular cab and 2-door King Cab. A 4-door version of the D22 was designed and developed during 1997–1998, being first produced in April 1999 and launched in May 1999 in the US as the 2000 Frontier Crew Cab. Engines: Petrol (KA24DE) and Diesel (TD27) (2wd and 4wd) with 5-speed manual transmission. These models were also exported to Central and South America.

A special Desert Runner model was offered in 1999 for the 2000 MY. It was a 2WD King Cab model built on the 4WD frame, which gave it a boost in ride height, larger tires, and a 4- or 5-speed transmission. For 2001 the Desert Runner got a new look and a supercharged version of the V6 engine.

Facelift 
In February 2000 at the Chicago Auto Show, Nissan introduced a facelifted D22 Frontier for 2001, with bolder styling in an effort to make it more appealing to younger buyers in its second generation. The regular cab would be discontinued after the 2001 MY. Sales and production started in North America, with Crew Cab and King Cab versions and new grille, bumper, headlights, taillights. Other body changes included built in fender flares and tailgates.

The D22s badged as "Frontier" had different grille, tailgate details and interior in contrast to the D22s badged as "Navara".

The D22 was no longer sold in Japan after 2002. Due to incompatible taxation rules and plummeting popularity of pickup trucks in Japan, Nissan discontinued it in their home market with no replacement afterwards, a fate shared by many of its competitors there.

The Egyptian plant exports to the Middle East, and a South African plant to African countries. Mexican production started in 2008: D22 truck Single Cab Chassis and Long Bed (2WD or 4WD, 2.4-liter petrol or diesel), Crew Cab (2WD and petrol) called the D22 Pickup.

In 2009 the D22 was updated with redesigned exterior door handles.

In June 2017, Peugeot announced to produce the Peugeot Pick-Up for Northern African states. It is a badge engineered version of the DongFeng Rich, which has a partnership with PSA. It comes as a Crew Cab (5 passengers) short bed (1.40 m x 1.39 m cargo area) version (5.08 m in length) with a payload of 815 kg. Market introduction started in September 2017.

Australia 
For the Australian market, the D22 Navara ran as a series 1 from the end of the D21 until 2001, when a series 2 was released with a new ZD30 Diesel engine and updated front end. The ZD30 powered D22's were exceptionally reliable unlike the Patrol counterparts, but were replaced in 2008 with an upgraded Common Rail 2.5L Diesel engine. The D22 Navara was run in parallel with the larger D40 until 2015. Both were replaced by the D23 Navara - locally known as the NP300 Navara as of 2015.

Brazil 
The Brazilian Nissan plant started production around 2002 (Crew Cab Diesel 2WD or 4WD, five-speed manual, or single cab 2WD diesel. Only for Mexican market: petrol 2.4-liter manufactured in Mexico) and it was exported to Argentina (all Brazilian versions) and Mexico (Crew Cab, petrol 2.4-liter, 2WD, five-speed manual).

Bolivia 
Nissan Bolivia imported from Japan the Nissan Frontier D22 Crew Cab, 2.4-liter petrol or diesel, 4WD. Imported from Mexico, the D22 Crew Cab and single cab long bed, petrol 2WD. Some Frontiers were gray imported from the USA. These were V6 with automatic transmission for private importers.

Chile 
In Chile, the D22 was marketed as the "Nissan Terrano" (a name previously used in the WD21 SUV) due to KIA Motors already using the "Frontier" moniker in its Bongo minivan series. It was sold from 1998 to 2014 and according to the National Automobile Association of Chile it was the most sold automobile in 2010. The facelifted "Navara" version arrived in 2003, in 2.4L petrol, 2.5L turbo diesel, 3.0L turbo diesel and 3.2L diesel. Even with the unveiling of the D40 Navara in 2008, it continued to be sold as a cheaper and more work-oriented alternative, outselling the D40. Starting in 2012, all D22 models were imported from Mexico replacing the Japanese model's injection pump with a common rail fuel-injection system, among other changes and the 3.0L and 3.2L models were discontinued. The D22 was replaced by the Nissan D23 "NP300" in 2015.

Engines 
Nissan first offered the D22 with a four-cylinder engine, the KA24DE, but added the V6 engine, the VG33E in 1999. In Australia the D22 had the KA24E till 1999, then changed to KA24DE option that year. A 3.0-liter V6 was introduced in June 2000. A supercharged version of the 3.3-liter V6 became available with introduction of the face-lifted 2001 models. In February 2003, 4x4 models received a larger 3.3-liter V6 (available only with a 5-speed manual), while 4x2 models continued with the 3.0 (with manual or automatic transmissions). The V6 was dropped in 2005, leaving the 2.5-liter turbo diesel as the only available engine.

The first series of D22s had larger (QD32) 3.2-litre normally aspirated diesel engines producing 75 kW. It also had a (NA20S) 2.0 litre petrol sohc 8 valve engine producing 75 kW.

Safety
The African version of the NP300 received 0 stars for adult occupants and 2 stars for infants from Global NCAP in 2018 (similar to Latin NCAP 2013).

Gallery

International names
 Big M Frontier (Thailand, 1998–2001)
 Datsun (Japan)
 Didsun or Datsun (Persian Gulf countries)
 Fiera (Bolivia)
 Frontier (USA, Canada, Philippines, Argentina, Paraguay, Uruguay, Mexico, Brazil and Thailand, 2001–2007)
 Navara (Europe and Australasia)
 NP300 (Mexico, some European markets; in Mexico "Frontier" is a luxury trim of the NP300)
 NP300 Hardbody (South Africa)
 Pick Up (Europe, Central and South America, Africa, Asia)
 Terrano (Chile)
 Skystar (Turkey, facelift Navara)
 Winner (Middle East) (Crew Cab only)

Rebadged versions
 Dongfeng/ZNA Rich (D22 pre-facelift)
 Bhamo Pickup (Myanmar)
 Giad Pickup (Sudan)
 Peugeot Pick-Up (Africa)

Second generation (D40; 2004) 

The D40 model was introduced at the 2004 North American International Auto Show. It uses the new Nissan F-Alpha platform and exterior body styling resembles that of the company's full-size Nissan Titan truck.

The new truck has a fully boxed ladder frame. (wheelbase and length for 4 door with 6 foot bed 139.9 in. /219.4 in.) Also available is the QR25DE four-cylinder engine, which is also found in the Nissan Altima. A six-speed manual is standard with a five-speed automatic optional. Both rear and four-wheel drive are available. Traction control and hill-descent control are also available.

The Frontier is called Navara when sold in Europe. The stronger version has  of torque.

Suzuki sold a Frontier-based mid-sized pickup produced by Nissan North America at the Smyrna plant. The truck debuted at the 2008 Chicago Auto Show as the Suzuki Equator. For 2009 the Frontier received a facelift with more options, colors, and new wheels. The Nismo model was replaced by the PRO-4X model. Suzuki discontinued the Equator in 2013, as part of the shutdown of their American passenger car division.

In 2012, production in the United States was shifted from Smyrna, Tennessee to Canton, Mississippi.

Sales of the PRO-4X model continue in Mexico.

In 2014, Nissan released a concept truck with a 2.8-liter Inline-four engine Cummins Diesel engine paired with a ZF 8HP transmission.

D40 Navara 
The Navara in Europe came with an updated Euro IV compliant engine on post September 2006 vehicles. It has four trim levels, the S, SE, Outlaw and Aventura. The Aventura trim package is equipped with leather upholstery, dual zone climate control, six-stacker CD/MP3 changer and satellite navigation as standard.

In Australia, New Zealand, South Africa and South America, the D40 Navara has a few differences from the UK versions. There are two engines available, 2.5-liter turbocharged diesel engine and the V6 petrol. Both engines come with a standard five-speed automatic, with a six-speed manual available for the diesel. These models do not have leather, climate control or satellite navigation system like their UK versions.

The 2008 model of the Navara was launched on 2 July. Changes included a new style of alloy wheels, bluetooth as standard, side work lights and indicators on the wing mirrors.

The 2008 Single Cab became available in Thailand 6 March. This model has 15-inch wheels. Power steering is standard. Also available are electric mirrors and central power locking as optional extra. Nissan planned to sell the single cab and began to export worldwide at the same month. Nissan also continues to sell the D22 pickups with minor updates for a lower price (now called as Frontier LCV).

The Nissan Navara Double Cab became available in Malaysia on 5 November 2008. A year later the six-speed manual version became available. The D22 series Nissan Frontier remains on sale in Malaysia with a manual transmission.

In November 2008, Nissan Thailand Released the all new Nissan Navara Calibre with a 144 PS (106 kW) at 4000 rpm 36.3 kg·m (356 N·m; 263 ft·lbf) at 2000 rpm available with a five-speed automatic or a six-speed manual transmission.

Facelift 

For North American Frontiers model year 2009, and European Navaras model year 2010, Nissan updated the shape of some minor components.

There are subtle changes to the headlights and the bonnet. The V-shaped grille shell is less pronounced and the bumper is rounder and projects 80 mm further forward, but the six-spoke 17-inch alloy wheels or optional 18-inch alloy wheels are the biggest change.

Inside the new Navara (top-of-the-line model), Nissan designers have specified softer materials of a better quality for the dash, seats and interior moulds. The centre console and fascia designs have been revised, as have the instrument binnacle layout and door trims. Additional bright/gloss finish surfacing is used throughout the cabin. The six-stack CD audio system or the TV Navigation entertainment console is upgraded with speed-sensing volume, MP3 compatibility and Bluetooth connectivity for the (six disc CD audio system). Other new or revised features include dual-zone climate control, remote audio/Bluetooth/trip computer controls on the steering wheel, trip computer, external temperature gauge, speed-sensitive variable windscreen wipers and 'follow me home' lighting. The electric mirrors now fold in fully for car washes or parking in narrow spaces.

Importantly, the upgraded Navara (diesel only) gains stability control, which Nissan calls Vehicle Dynamics Control and all petrol V6 and diesel variants gain side-impact and side-curtain airbags to complement the dual front airbags.

Nissan updated the Frontier for the 2020 model year with a new 3.8-liter V6 and a nine-speed automatic, with the manual transmission being discontinued. The 6 speed manual is available in Canada on the Pro-4X model. The engine replaces both the outgoing 4.0L V6 and the 2.5L I4, and produces , although torque remains the same. The lineup has also been revised: the Frontier King Cab model will offer both rear-wheel-drive and all-wheel-drive configurations on the S and SV models; the Crew Cab model, meanwhile, extends rear-wheel drive and all-wheel drive to the SV standard bed and SV long bed trims, while the Pro-4X gets all-wheel drive exclusively. Power windows and locks are now standard on all trim levels.

Safety 
The D40 Navara has undergone Euro NCAP crash testing along with the Mitsubishi Triton and Isuzu D-Max, and received one star with a strikeout; however, after retesting with upgraded computer software it went from the lowest in the group to the highest (overall) with 3 stars. Among the problems discovered during the test was delayed airbag deployment and insufficient seatbelt restraint, which were solved with the software upgrade.

Awards and recognition 
 2021 Nissan Frontier is an Edmunds.com 2021 Top-Rated Midsize Truck.
 2011 Nissan Frontier received the highest rating for Insurance Institute for Highway Safety Front, Side, and Roof Strength Evaluations.
 2011 Nissan Frontier was an Edmunds.com 2011 Top Recommended Compact Truck.
 2010 Nissan Frontier received the U.S. National Highway Traffic Safety Administration's Highest Side-impact Safety Rating (5 stars).
 2010 Nissan Frontier Received J.D. Power and Associates Highest Ranked Midsize Pickup in Initial Quality Award.

Third generation (D23; 2014) 

On 11 June 2014, Nissan unveiled the third generation Navara, codenamed the D23 and released as the NP300 Navara. Series production commenced at a new $360 million plant in Samut Prakan, Thailand in July 2014 and deliveries began in August. The D23 is not available in the US or Canada in favour of the larger D41 Frontier, replacing the D40. The European model will feature a 2.3-litre engine from the Nissan NV400.

After the release of the D23, which is only available with 4-cylinder engines, the D40 remained on production only with the V6 and automatic transmission.

For the 2018 model year, the Navara is equipped with Nissan Intelligent Mobility technology which include an Around View Monitor and a blind-spot monitoring system.

Safety
The Latin American 2022 Frontier has disc brakes on all wheels.

Latin NCAP
The Navara in its most basic Latin American configuration with 2 airbags received 4 stars for adult occupants and 4 stars for infants from Latin NCAP in 2019.

IIHS

2018
The 2018 Frontier was tested by the IIHS:

2021
The 2021 Frontier was tested by the IIHS:

2022
The 2022 Frontier was tested by the IIHS:

2020 facelift
On 5 November 2020, Nissan unveiled the facelifted D23 Navara along with the introduction of the Pro-4X trim level. The engines remain the same, but active safety equipment has been added. The facelifted model goes on sale in Australia in the first quarter of 2021.

The pre-facelift model stays produced in Barcelona plant for European markets until December 16, 2021. The reasons are declining sales of the Navara in the region and the fact the plant has been shut down.

In March 2022, Nissan started producing the facelifted Frontier in Argentina. As of 2022, 34% of its parts are locally made and 65% of its production (including the Renault Alaskan) is exported.

Nissan Navara EnGuard Concept

The EnGuard concept is a modified D23 Navara pitched directly towards emergency rescue organisations. Unveiled at the 2016 Hannover Motor Show, the concept is notable for being the first prototype with a Nissan designed and developed portable battery pack. Other features that cater for rescue organisations include an onboard DJI Phantom 4 drone, an increased ride height, strobe lights and a fully adjustable suspension system.

Mercedes-Benz X-Class

On 25 October 2016, Mercedes-Benz revealed 2 concept pickup trucks previewing the upcoming joint-built pickup to be called "X-Class". The X-Class is based on the platform of the D23 Navara and is built in Barcelona, Spain with planned production in Córdoba, Argentina, however, the latter was cancelled due to a disagreement between Nissan and Mercedes-Benz regarding production costs as well as that country's economic situation. Production of the X-Class was discontinued in 2020 due to poor sales.

Renault Alaskan

Renault revealed the production version of the Alaskan Pickup Concept which will be based on the current Navara platform. The Alaskan was shown alongside other Renault Models at the 2016 Paris Motor Show in October.

From October 2016, the Alaskan is sold in Colombia. The pick-up was sold throughout Europe in 2017.

Production commences in Santa Isabel, Argentina from October 2020.

Dongfeng Rich 6

In October 2018, the Dongfeng Rich 6 was launched as a more premium pickup option under the Dongfeng Motor Co., Ltd. brand and produced by Zhengzhou Nissan alongside the Chinese market Navara. The Dongfeng Rich 6 features a redesigned front end resulting in an extra 35 mm of length with the rest of the vehicle body being shared directly with the Navara.

Motorsports 
The D40 Frontier platform is currently being used as a Stage Rally vehicle by the NISMO Stuff Racing effort currently competing in the Coupe Rallye Quebec series. This team has been racing the current D40 Frontier for over two years with eight stage rallies and two hill climbs under its belt having never suffered a mechanical failure of any kind.

Nissan South Africa campaigned both the D22 and D40 platforms very successfully in the local ABSA Off-Road Series, winning eight consecutive driver's championships (2001 to 2008). The vehicles were prepared by Hallspeed South Africa. Hallspeed also developed and sold vehicles to the Belgian-based company Overdrive. For several years Overdrive have competed with the Hallspeed built vehicles in the European rally Raid series, including The Dakar.

Sales

References

External links 

 Nissan pages: U.S, Indonesia
 Nissan Navara 2008 EuroNCAP results

Navara
Cars introduced in 1997
2000s cars
2010s cars
2020s cars
Pickup trucks
Rear-wheel-drive vehicles
All-wheel-drive vehicles
Off-road vehicles
Euro NCAP pick-ups
Global NCAP pick-ups
Latin NCAP pick-ups
Motor vehicles manufactured in the United States
Cars powered by longitudinal 4-cylinder engines
Cars of Brazil
Cars of Argentina